Abdullah Khattab  (born 9 November 1994) is a Saudi football player who currently plays for Al-Qaisumah as a winger. On 7 October 2020, Khattab joined Al-Adalah on loan.

References

External links 
 

1994 births
Living people
Saudi Arabian footballers
Al-Wehda Club (Mecca) players
Al-Nojoom FC players
Damac FC players
Al-Mujazzal Club players
Al-Adalah FC players
Al-Jabalain FC players
Al-Qaisumah FC players
Saudi First Division League players
Saudi Professional League players
Association football forwards